Fred Perry (1909–1995) was a British tennis player and originator of the clothing line.

Fred Perry may also refer to:

 Fred Perry (boxer) (1904-1981), British Olympic boxer
 Fred Perry (comics) (born 1969), American comic artist
 Fred Perry (Canadian football) (born 1975), American player of Canadian football
 Fred Perry (footballer) (1933–2016), English footballer

See also
 Perry (surname)